Société de Microélectronique et d'Horlogerie was the name of the holding company created by the merger enforced by the Swiss Banks in 1983 of the SSIH and ASUAG, renamed The Swatch Group in 1998.

Ernst Thomke, previously CEO of Ebauches SA and ETA SA, was appointed to head the newly established conglomerate as its first CEO. He held his position until 1991. When he resigned, the newly elected President of the Board, Nicolas G. Hayek, had already managed to become the only person of reference.

References

Defunct watchmaking companies
Companies established in 1983